There were special elections to the U.S. House of Representatives in 1921.

 : Lamar Jeffers (D) elected June 7, 1921 to finish term of incumbent ember-elect Fred Blackmon (D), who had died February 8, 1921.

 

 

 

 

 
1921